Nyplatys is a genus of flies in the family Stratiomyidae.

Species
Nyplatys cultellata (Lindner, 1939)
Nyplatys niger Séguy, 1938

References

Stratiomyidae
Brachycera genera
Taxa named by Eugène Séguy
Diptera of Africa